Leuthen was the given name to a wolfpack of German U-boats that operated during the World War II Battle of the Atlantic in 1943 from 15 September 1943 to 24 September 1943

Service history
Leuthen was formed in September 1943 and was established to renew the attack on the North Atlantic route. 
Following the defeats of May 1943, and the devastating losses incurred by the U-boat Arm (U-Bootwaffe, UBW) then, Admiral Dönitz had withdrawn from attacks on the North Atlantic route while awaiting tactical and technical improvements.
By September 1943 these were ready.

Leuthen was disbanded after this assault, at the end of September; of the remaining 15 boats, 3 returned to base and 12 formed the core of a new patrol line, code-named Rossbach.

Raiding History

U-boats

The name
The name "Leuthen" was a reference to the battle of Leuthen fought by Frederick the Great during the Seven Years' War.

References

Bibliography
 

Wolfpacks of 1943
Wolfpack Leuthen